The 1902 Nebraska Cornhuskers football team represented the University of Nebraska as an independent during the 1902 college football season. Led by third-year head coach Walter C. Booth, the Cornhuskers compiled a record of 9–0, excluding one exhibition game. Nebraska played home games at Antelope Field in Lincoln, Nebraska.

coach compiled a 9–0 record and shut out every opponent by a combined score of 164–0. The Cornhuskers 's hopes to be considered the western champion were dashed when 11–0 Michigan was selected instead selected following their season-ending 23–6 win over Minnesota (Nebraska defeated the Gophers 6–0). Believing Michigan's membership in the Western Conference elevated its title chances, Nebraska applied to the conference following the season, but the application was denied on account of Lincoln's distance from other schools in the conference. Nebraska ultimately joined the conference over 100 years later, in 2011.

Schedule

Coaching staff

Roster

Game summaries

Lincoln High

For the fourth consecutive season, NU opened the year with an exhibition game against Lincoln High School.

Doane

at Colorado

Nebraska met Colorado for the second time in Boulder. A touchdown in each half and a stiff defensive effort secured Nebraska's third straight shutout victory.

Grinnell

Nebraska was shorthanded due to injury, but the Cornhuskers posted another shutout victory on a rainy day in Lincoln.

Minnesota

Nebraska traveled to Minneapolis to face the Gophers for a third time. The game remained scoreless until the final minutes, when the Cornhuskers scored a touchdown for what would be the only points of the day. Minnesota lost only one other game the rest of the season, outscoring its opponents 335–34.

Missouri

Meeting Missouri on new neutral ground, in St. Joseph for the first time, the Cornhuskers ended an early scoring attempt by Missouri at the Nebraska 7-yard line, and then shut down the Tigers for the rest of the day, while making two touchdowns of their own to extend the shutout streak to 6, and the series lead to 8-3.

Haskell

Kansas

Nebraska ran its shutout streak to seven consecutive games, thanks in part to a "trick placekick", that was instead run for a touchdown.

Knox

Nebraska hosted Knox in the first game between the teams, in what would become one of only two one-score game NU played all season. Knox held Nebraska to just seven points, but the Cornhuskers made a goal-line stand in the second half to record an eighth consecutive shutout.

Northwestern

Nebraska met Northwestern in the first matchup between teams that would become division rivals over 100 years later when NU joined the Big Ten. Northwestern players complained of rough treatment from NU throughout the penalty-ridden game. Nebraska was penalized for seven holding penalties, each of which required turning over the ball according to the rules of the time, but held Northwestern scoreless for a ninth straight shutout win to end the season with a perfect record.

References

Nebraska
Nebraska Cornhuskers football seasons
College football undefeated seasons
Nebraska Cornhuskers football